Gladys Elphick  (27 August 1904 – 19 January 1988) was an Australian Aboriginal woman of Kaurna and Ngadjuri descent, best known as the founding president of the Council of Aboriginal Women of South Australia, which became the Aboriginal Council of South Australia in 1973.  She was known to the community as Auntie Glad.

Early life
Gladys Elphick was born Gladys Walters in Adelaide, South Australia, but was raised at the Point Pearce Mission on the Yorke Peninsula. On leaving school at age twelve, she worked in Point Pearce's dairy. Elphick married Walter Hughes, a shearer, in 1922. After her husband's death in 1937, Elphick moved to Adelaide, lived with her cousin Gladys O'Brien, and worked as a domestic. Elphick worked at the Islington Railway Workshops in Adelaide's northern suburbs during World War II creating shells and other munitions. She married Frederick Elphick in 1940.

Community work
Elphick joined the Aborigines Advancement League of South Australia in the 1940s and became active in committee work with the League in the 1960s. In 1964, Elphick became the founding president of the Council of Aboriginal Women of South Australia, a role she served until 1973. The Council was active in campaigning for the 1967 Referendum. The Council became the Aboriginal Council of South Australia in 1973, and from then included men in its remit and governance.

Also in 1973, Elphick was involved in setting up the Aboriginal Community Centre, and served as its treasurer, and helped establish the College of Aboriginal Education in 1973. She co-founded the Aboriginal Medical Service of South Australia in 1977.

Awards, honours and legacy
Elphick was appointed a Member of the Order of the British Empire (MBE) in 1971 in recognition of service to the Aboriginal community.

She was named South Australian Aborigine of the Year in 1984, during National Aborigines Week.

A plaque honouring Elphick and her work for the community is part of the Jubilee 150 Walkway, a series of 150 bronze plaques set into the footpath of North Terrace, Adelaide commemorating "a selection of people who had made a significant contribution to the community or gained national and international recognition for their work".

An award has been named in her honour by the International Women's Day Committee (South Australia). Presented since 2003, it is a Community Spirit Award Acknowledging Outstanding Aboriginal Women. Known as the Gladys Elphick Award, it is awarded to recognise Aboriginal women working to advance the status of Indigenous people.

One of the parks in the western parklands of Adelaide has been named Gladys Elphick Park in her honour.

A Google Doodle released on 27 August 2019 was dedicated to her.

The first Gladys Elphick Memorial Oration is scheduled to be given on 17 July 2021 by journalist Stan Grant as a keynote address of the Adelaide Festival of Ideas, in collaboration with the History Trust of South Australia and Reconciliation SA. The title of the inaugural address is "Flagging Intentions", referring to the Aboriginal flag.

References

External links
Gladys Elphick MBE, in S.A.'s Greats: the men and women of the North Terrace plaques, via Adelaidia

1904 births
1988 deaths
People from Adelaide
Australian indigenous rights activists
Women human rights activists
Indigenous Australian welfare workers
Australian Members of the Order of the British Empire
20th-century Australian women
Kaurna